Poonish Mehta (born 4 November 1993) is an Indian cricketer who plays for Haryana. He made his List A debut on 13 December 2015 in the 2015–16 Vijay Hazare Trophy. He made his Twenty20 debut on 7 January 2016 in the 2015–16 Syed Mushtaq Ali Trophy.

References

External links
 

1993 births
Living people
Indian cricketers
Haryana cricketers
People from Gurgaon